Ardooie is a municipality in the Belgian province of West Flanders. The municipality comprises the towns of Ardooie proper and Koolskamp. In 2006 Ardooie had a total population of 9,147. The local inhabitants are called Ardooienaren. During the First World War Hitler was stationed in Ardooie quartered  with a family.  He painted some of the buildings and the countryside.

Sights
 St. Martin's Church (Sint-Martinuskerk) with a Gothic tower, listed since 1939 as part of the national monumental heritage;
 the mansion de Mûelenaere, today a library;
 Ardooie Castle, also known as the De Jonghe d'Ardoye Castle ( or Kasteel De Jonghe d'Ardoye): this Neo-Classical country house was built at the end of the 18th century by the local landowners, the Van Ardooie family, who also called themselves as D'Ardoye. It became a protected historical monument in 1984, housing a communication agency since 2007. The building and most of the grounds remain private property.
 a brewery-complex from the 19th century;
 the Rysselende Mill, constructed in 1855.

Hamlets

Next to Ardooie itself is the part-municipality Koolskamp. Part of Ardooie is also the hamlet De Tassche, about two kilometers west from the centre of Ardooie, on the border with the city of Roeselare. In the east on the border with the neighbouring municipality Meulebeke, part of the hamlet 't Veld, also called de Sneppe, is situated in Ardooie.

Ardooie is adjacent to the following villages:
a. Lichtervelde (Lichtervelde municipality)
b. Zwevezele (Wingene municipality)
c. Egem (Pittem municipality)
d. Pittem (Pittem municipality)
e. Meulebeke (Meulebeke municipality)
f. Emelgem (Izegem city)
g. Kachtem (Izegem city)
h. Roeselare (Roeselare city)
i. Beveren (Roeselare city)

Accessibility
The motorway E403 runs through the west of the village and has two exits, one for Ardooie itself (exit 8) and one for the part-municipality Koolskamp (exit 9). On the other side of the village runs the N50 district road from Bruges to Kortrijk (the Rysselende Mill is built by this road).

Ardooie is separated from Koolskamp by the railway line Adinkerke-Ghent. Until the mid-1980s years Ardooie had two NMBS- railway stations: one in the north of the main village and one on the quarter "De Kortekeer".

Industry
Although the village is quite small, many companies have their head-office here. It is best known for its frozen vegetables factories, seven in total, the highest number for a single municipality in Europe.

The major companies in Ardooie are:

 Afschrift, industrial electricity and automation
 Ardicor, inhouse (de)construction
 Ardo (formerly Ardovries), frozen foods
 Ardovlam, protection against fire and burglary in buildings
 d'Arta, frozen vegetables
 Danis, in Koolskamp, producer of animal foods and specialising in construction of pig-sties
 Devriese, road construction
 DeZetel, furniture
 Dicogel-Begro, frozen vegetables
 Haco (earlier: Kimac), manufacturer of woodworking machines
 Homifreez, frozen vegetables
 Louage & Wisselinck, construction of doors and furniture
 Metafox, furniture
 OVA, manufacturer of industrial vehicles
 Polaris Creative Solutions, creative agency and marketing company
 Planquette, veal
 Sioen Industries, textile manufacturer (mainly coated textiles, sails, fine chemicals and professional protective clothing).
 Trans Novero, truck company
 Unifrost, frozen vegetables
 Vitalo, packaging
 Voeders Callewaert, animal nutrition

In 2001 and 2005 Ardooie won the Prize for the most profit-making municipality in West Flanders, announced by the Belgian economic magazine Trends. All except for Vitalo and Trans Novero have their head-office located there.

Politics
Ardooie has been led for many years by the local VLD-party "Groep82" (Group82) that occupied 2/3 of the seats in 2006 .
The mayor since 1989 is Karlos Callens, also a Flemish People's representative. He puts a lot effort into making Ardooie known in the world. By his work the Eneco Tour finished and started in Ardooie in 2008 and 2009.

Events
Cyclocross race in October
Sint-maartenfeest (St. Martin's Day) (11 November)

Born in Ardooie
1874: Cyriel Verschaeve, priest, poet and collaborator.
1959: Filip Vanhaecke, marathon runner
1965: Marc Degryse, football player

References

External links

 

 
Municipalities of West Flanders